Miguel Figueroa (born 30 September 1965) is a Puerto Rican former swimmer who competed in the 1984 Summer Olympics. Miguel was also the MVP in the 1985 LAI (Liga Atletica Interuniversitaria of Puerto Rico) Championships 6 Records in five events ranging from the 100 meters free to 1500 free. Member of the 1985 LAI CAAM championship water polo team.

References

1966 births
Living people
Puerto Rican male swimmers
Puerto Rican male freestyle swimmers
Olympic swimmers of Puerto Rico
Swimmers at the 1984 Summer Olympics